Mavrorrachi is a village of the Langadas municipality. Before the 2011 local government reform it was part of the municipality of Lachanas. The 2011 census recorded 31 inhabitants in the village. Mavrorrachi is a part of the community of Karteres.

See also
 List of settlements in the Thessaloniki regional unit

References

Populated places in Thessaloniki (regional unit)